The Israel Super Cup, also known as the Champion of Champions (Aluf HaAlufim), is an Israeli association football club competition played as a single match between the winner of the latest Israeli top league champions and the winner of the latest Israel State Cup.  If a team won both the championship and the state cup, their designated rival for the Super Cup match was the league runner-up.

The cup was first contested in 1957, but the title was an informal title, not sanctioned by the IFA Until 1969. As an IFA sanctioned competition, the competition was played annually, except for 1972, 1973 and 1987 until its cancellation in 1990.

Between 1969 and 1971 The IFA also sanctioned a "Champion of Champions" match for Liga Alef, which was played between the two regional winners of Liga Alef. The match was played once more, at the end of the 1975–76 season, and was discontinued after the establishment of Liga Artzit.

The most successful club is Maccabi Tel Aviv with 7 wins.

In March 2014 the IFA announced the renewal of the competition.

History
The title was first contested in 1957 in a match between League winners, Hapoel Tel Aviv and Cup winners, Hapoel Petah Tikva. The cup, which wasn't sanctioned by the IFA, was named after Lt-Col Zivi Tzafriri and was won by Hapoel Tel Aviv, who had beaten its rivals 3–0.

The Next time the competition was contested, in 1963, the cup was donated by Ilanshil-Polio, an Israeli organization dedicated to aid Poliomyelitis victims, with proceedings going towards the organization. In the match, Hapoel Petah Tikva and Maccabi Haifa have drawn 2–2.

Starting from the 1964–65 season, the match was played in each season until 1990, except for 1972, 1973 and 1987. The IFA decided upon making the cup an official title at the beginning of the 1968–69 season, set it to be played at the beginning of each season 
 and ruled that in case of a club winning both the league championship and the cup, their designated rival for the Super Cup match would be the league runner-up. The IFA also set a "Champion of Champions" match for Liga Alef, to be played between the two divisional winners. The first Liga Alef Super Cup was played between Maccabi Petah Tikva and Beitar Tel Aviv in June 1969, the former winning 3–0.

In 1979, the cup was named after Israeli sports broadcaster Nehemia Ben Avraham following Ben Avraham's death.

In March 2014 the IFA announced the renewal of the competition. However, the match planned for the beginning of the 2014–15 season was cancelled, with the intent to play it the next season.

The competition was renewed in August 2015.

Liga Leumit Super Cup

Winners

Unofficial Competitions

Official Competitions

Note: ru Indicate that the team was Runner-up and played for the Super Cup as the League Champion won this season's Double.

Performance by club

Liga Alef Super Cup

Notes

References
 Bleicher, Yaniv. "Israel – List of 'Champions of Champions' (Super Cup) Finals", RSSSF.
100 Years of Football 1906-2006, Elisha Shohat (Israel), 2006, p. 345 

 
Football competitions in Israel
National association football supercups
1957 establishments in Israel
Recurring sporting events established in 1957